The North Branch of the Millers River is a river in southwestern New Hampshire and northern Massachusetts in the United States. It is a tributary of the Millers River, which flows west to the Connecticut River, which in turn flows south to Long Island Sound, an arm of the Atlantic Ocean.

The North Branch rises in New Ipswich, New Hampshire, at the outlet of Mountain Pond. It flows west through Island Pond into Rindge, and passes the villages of East Rindge and Converseville to Lake Monomonac. From the lake's outlet in Massachusetts, the North Branch flows south parallel to U.S. Route 202, joining the Millers River at Whitney Pond in Winchendon.

If the channel length of  through Lake Monomonac were included, the total length would be .

See also 

List of rivers of Massachusetts
List of rivers of New Hampshire

References

Rivers of Worcester County, Massachusetts
Rivers of New Hampshire
Tributaries of the Connecticut River
Rivers of Massachusetts
Rivers of Cheshire County, New Hampshire